BCSA may refer to:
Baltimore County State's Attorney
Bible College of South Australia
Book Collectors Society of Australia
British Columbia Soccer Association
British Constructional Steelwork Association